Crawley Baths was a public swimming facility, in Matilda Bay, near Crawley, Western Australia along Mounts Bay Road.  The timber structure was opened on 7 February 1914. The opening ceremony was conducted by Premier John Scaddan and included a swimming carnival and life saving displays.

The baths were the largest enclosed body of water in the southern hemisphere and were an important recreational facility in Perth for fifty years.  They were demolished in 1964 after Beatty Park was built for the 1962 Commonwealth Games.

A bronze statue Eliza commemorates the baths and stands in the river near its former location.

See also
Perth City Baths

References

External links
 Sunday Times February 1936 (photo of children's swimming classes at Crawley Baths)

Sports venues in Perth, Western Australia
Swimming venues in Australia
History of Perth, Western Australia
Swan River (Western Australia)
Crawley, Western Australia
Bathing in Australia